Transparental is the ninth solo album by Dutch guitarist Jan Akkerman, released in 1980. It appeared under the name "Jan Akkerman and Kaz Lux".

Track listing
"Inspiration" - 6:20
"Apocalypso" - 6:35
"Concentrate Don't Hesitate" - 6:35
"Transparental" - 1:10
"I Don't Take It Much Longer" - 3:55
"Marsha" - 5:20
"You're Not the Type" - 6:05
"The Party Is Over" - 4:40

Personnel
Kaz Lux - vocals, guitar
Jan Akkerman - guitars, guitar synthesizer
Cees van der Laarse - bass guitar
Pierre van der Linden - drums
Manuel Lopez - drums on tracks 6 and 8
Rick van der Linden - keyboards
Eddy Conard - percussion
Grace van der Laarse - Percussion

1980 albums
Jan Akkerman albums